Joseph V. Egan (born February 27, 1938) is an American Democratic Party politician, who represents the 17th Legislative District in the New Jersey General Assembly, where he has served since 2002.

Egan has served in the General Assembly as the Deputy Majority Leader since 2008.

Early life and education
Egan was born on February 27, 1938, in New Brunswick, New Jersey. He attended St. Peter the Apostle High School and shortly thereafter joined the International Brotherhood of Electrical Workers (I.B.E.W.) Local Union 456. He served on the New Brunswick City Council from 1982 to 2010 and was council president for nine years.

New Jersey Assembly 
In November 2001, Egan was elected to the General Assembly from the 17th District succeeding Bob Smith who was elected to the State Senate and Jerry Green who was redistricted to the 22nd District. From 2002 to 2010, Egan simultaneously held a seat in the New Jersey General Assembly and on the New Brunswick City Council. This dual position, often called double dipping, had been allowed under a grandfather clause in the state law enacted by the New Jersey Legislature and signed into law by Governor of New Jersey Jon Corzine in September 2007 that prevents dual-office-holding but allows those who had held both positions as of February 1, 2008, to retain both posts.

Committee assignments 
Committee assignments for the 2022—23 Legislative Session session are:
Labor, Chair
Telecommunications and Utilities

District 17 
Each of the 40 districts in the New Jersey Legislature has one representative in the New Jersey Senate and two members in the New Jersey General Assembly. The representatives from the 17th District for the 2022—23 Legislative Session are:
Senator Bob Smith  (D)
Assemblyman Joseph Danielsen  (D)
Assemblyman Joseph V. Egan  (D)

Personal life 
Egan is Business Manager for the I.B.E.W. Local 456. He is a former president of the union's executive board. Egan continues to reside in New Brunswick with his wife Yolanda, married since 1959. They have four children and seven grandchildren. His son Kevin succeeded him on the New Brunswick City Council after Egan retired from it in 2010. Egan is a member of the St. Peter The Apostle Church Parish and is a former vice president of the parish council. His son-in-law is Craig Biggio. Egan's grandson, Cavan Biggio, is a second baseman for the Toronto Blue Jays.

Electoral history

New Jersey Assembly

References

External links
Assemblyman Egan's legislative web page, New Jersey Legislature
New Jersey Legislature financial disclosure forms: 2011 2010 2009 2008 2007 2006 2005 2004
Assembly Member Joseph V. Egan, Project Vote Smart
New Jersey Voter Information Website 2003

1938 births
Living people
New Jersey city council members
Democratic Party members of the New Jersey General Assembly
Politicians from New Brunswick, New Jersey
International Brotherhood of Electrical Workers people
21st-century American politicians